Michael Kafari (born October 30, 1991) is a Ghanaian footballer who currently plays as a defensive midfielder for AC Syracuse Pulse in the National Independent Soccer Association..

Career

College and Amateur
Kafari played college soccer at the University of New Mexico between 2010 and 2013.

While at college, Kafari appeared for Premier Development League side Austin Aztex in 2012.

Professional
Vancouver Whitecaps FC selected Kafari in the third round (No. 51 overall) of the 2014 MLS SuperDraft. However, he wasn't signed by the club, instead joining USL Pro side Charleston Battery.

Kafari left Charleston without making a league appearance, but was later signed by Major League Soccer side Sporting Kansas City.

After two years away from the professional game, Kafari signed with North American Soccer League side Puerto Rico FC in July 2016. He was released at the end of the 2017 season.

On 22 April 2018, Kafari joined Swedish fourth-tier club Motala.

On 27 August 2019, he joined New York Cosmos.

In April 2021, Kafari joined National Independent Soccer Association side New Amsterdam FC ahead of the spring 2021 season. He went on to play in all three of New Amsterdam's matches during the NISA Legends Cup and appeared in seven of the team's eight regular season games.

References

External links
 
 NISA player profile (note: some matches listed as "regular season" are actually not part of the standard league season)

1991 births
Living people
Ghanaian footballers
Ghanaian expatriate footballers
Footballers from Accra
New Mexico Lobos men's soccer players
Austin Aztex players
Charleston Battery players
Sporting Kansas City players
Puerto Rico FC players
Expatriate soccer players in the United States
USL League Two players
North American Soccer League players
National Independent Soccer Association players
Vancouver Whitecaps FC draft picks
Soccer players from Idaho
Expatriate footballers in Sweden
Association football midfielders
Ghanaian expatriate sportspeople in the United States
Ghanaian expatriate sportspeople in Sweden
Expatriate footballers in Puerto Rico